Indigenous peoples of California, commonly known as Indigenous Californians or Native Californians, are a diverse group of nations and peoples that are indigenous to the geographic area within the current boundaries of California before and after the colonization of Europeans. There are currently 109 federally recognized tribes in the state and over forty tribes or tribal bands that have applied for federal recognition. California has the second-largest Native American population in the United States.

Most tribes practiced forest gardening or permaculture and controlled burning to ensure the availability of food and medicinal plants as well as ecosystem balance. The tribes lived in separation from European settlers for thousands of years, who only began to invade their homelands for land, labor, and resources in the late 18th century. This began with the arrival of Spanish soldiers and missionaries who established Franciscan missions that instituted an immense rate of death and cultural genocide. 

Following California statehood, a state-sanctioned policy of elimination was carried out against its aboriginal people known as the California genocide in the establishment of Anglo-American settler colonialism. The Native population reached its lowest in the early 20th century while cultural assimilation into white society became imposed through Indian boarding schools. Native Californian peoples continue to advocate for their cultures, homelands, sacred sites, and their right to live.

In the 21st century, language revitalization began among some California tribes. The Land Back movement has taken shape in the state with more support to return land to tribes. There is a growing recognition by California of Native peoples' environmental knowledge to improve ecosystems and mitigate wildfires.

Classification 
The traditional homelands of many tribal nations may not conform exactly to the state of California's boundaries. Many tribes on the eastern border with Nevada have been classified as Great Basin tribes, while some tribes on the Oregon border are classified as Plateau tribes. Tribes in Baja California who do not cross into California are classified as indigenous peoples of Mexico. The Kumeyaay nation is split by the Mexico-United States border.

History

Indigenous

Evidence of human occupation of California dates from at least 19,000 years ago. Prior to European contact, indigenous Californians had 500 distinct sub-tribes or groups, each consisting of 50 to 500 individual members. The size of California tribes today are small compared to tribes in other regions of the United States. Prior to contact with Europeans, the California region contained the highest Native American population density north of what is now Mexico. Because of the temperate climate and easy access to food sources, approximately one-third of all Native Americans in the United States were living in the area of California.

Early Native Californians were hunter-gatherers, with seed collection becoming widespread around 9,000 BCE. Due to the local abundance of food, tribes never developed agriculture or tilled the soil. Two early southern California cultural traditions include the La Jolla complex and the Pauma Complex, both dating from c. 6050–1000 BCE. From 3000 to 2000 BCE, regional diversity developed, with the peoples making fine-tuned adaptations to local environments. Traits recognizable to historic tribes were developed by approximately 500 BCE.

The indigenous people practiced various forms of sophisticated forest gardening in the forests, grasslands, mixed woodlands, and wetlands to ensure availability of food and medicine plants. They controlled fire on a regional scale to create a low-intensity fire ecology; this prevented larger, catastrophic fires and sustained a low-density "wild" agriculture in loose rotation. By burning underbrush and grass, the natives revitalized patches of land and provided fresh shoots to attract food animals. A form of fire-stick farming was used to clear areas of old growth to encourage new in a repeated cycle; a permaculture.

Contact with Europeans

Different tribes encountered non-Native European explorers and settlers at widely different times. The southern and central coastal tribes encountered European explorers in the mid-16th century. Tribes such as the Quechan or Yuman Indians in present-day southeast California and southwest Arizona first encountered Spanish explorers in the 1760s and 1770s. Tribes on the coast of northwest California, like the Miwok, Yurok, and Yokut, had contact with Russian explorers and seafarers in the late 18th century. In remote interior regions, some tribes did not meet non-natives until the mid-19th century.

Late 18th century: Missions and decline

At the time of the establishment of the first Spanish Mission in 1769, the most widely accepted estimates say that California's indigenous population was around 340,000 people and possibly more. The indigenous peoples of California were extremely diverse and made up of ten different linguistic families with at least 78 distinct languages. These are further broken down into many dialects, while the people were organized into sedentary and semi-sedentary villages of 400-500 micro-tribes.

The Spanish began their long-term occupation in California in 1769 with the founding of Mission San Diego de Alcalá in San Diego. The Spanish built 20 additional missions in California, most of which were constructed in the late 18th century. From 1769 to 1832, an estimated total of 87,787 baptisms and 24,529 marriages had been conducted at the missions. In that same period, 63,789 deaths at the missions were recorded, indicating the immense death rate. This massive drop in population has been attributed to the introduction of diseases, which rapidly spread while native people were forced into close quarters at the missions, as well as torture, overworking, and malnourishment at the missions. 

The missions also introduced European invasive plant species as well as cattle grazing practices that significantly transformed the California landscape, altering native people's relationship to the land as well as key plant and animal species that had been integral to their ways of life and worldviews for thousands of years. The missions further perpetuated cultural genocide against native people through enforced conversion to Christianity and the prohibition of numerous cultural practices under threat of violence and torture, which were commonplace at the missions.

19th century: Genocide
The population of Native California was reduced by 90% during the 19th century—from more than 200,000 in the early 19th century to approximately 15,000 at the end of the century. The majority of this population decline occurred in the latter half of the century, under American occupation. While in 1848, the population of native people was about 150,000, by 1870 it fell to 30,000, and fell further to 16,000 by the end of the century.

The mass decline in population has been attributed to disease and epidemics that swept through Spanish missions in the early part of the century, such as an 1833 malaria epidemic, among other factors including state-sanctioned massacres that accelerated under Anglo-American rule.

Russian contacts (1812–1841) 

In the early 19th century, were usually associated with the activity of the Russian-American Company. A Russian explorer, Baron Ferdinand von Wrangell, visited California in 1818, 1833, and 1835. Looking for a potential site for a new outpost of the company in California in place of Fort Ross, Wrangell's expedition encountered the native people north of San Francisco Bay. He noted that local women, who were used to physical labor, seemed to be of stronger constitution than men, whose main activity was hunting. He summarized his impressions of the California Indians as a people with a natural propensity for independence, inventive spirit, and a unique sense of the beautiful.

Another notable Russian expedition to California was the 13 months long visit of the scientist Ilya Voznesensky in 1840–1841. Voznesensky's goal was to gather some ethnographic, biological, and geological materials for the collection of the Imperial Academy of Sciences. He described the locals that he met on his trip to Cape Mendocino as "the untamed Indian tribes of New Albion, who roam like animals and, protected by impenetrable vegetation, keep from being enslaved by the Spanish".

Mexican secularization (1833–1848) 

After about a decade of conservative rule in the First Mexican Republic, which formed in 1824 after Mexico gained independence from the Spanish Empire in 1821, a liberal sect of the First Mexican Republic passed an act to secularize the missions, which effectively ended religious authority over native people in Alta California. The legislation was primarily passed from liberal sects in the Mexican government, including José María Luis Mora, who believed that the missions prevented native people from accessing "the value of individual property."

The Mexican government did not return the lands to tribes, but made land grants to settlers of at least partial European ancestry, transforming the remaining parts of mission land into large land grants or ranchos. Secularization provided native people with the opportunity to leave the mission system, yet left many people landless, who were thus pressured into wage labor at the ranchos. The few Indigenous people who acquired land grants were those who have proven their Hispanicization and Christianization. This was noted in the land acquisition of Victoria Reid, an Indigenous woman born at the village of Comicranga.

American settler colonialism (1848–) 

The first governor of California as a U.S. state was Peter Hardenman Burnett, who came to power in 1848 following the United States victory in the Mexican–American War. As American settlers came in control of California with the signing of the Treaty of Guadalupe Hidalgo, its administrators honored some Mexican land grant titles, but did not honor aboriginal land title. 

With this shift in power, the U.S. government instituted a policy of elimination toward indigenous people in California. In his second state address in 1851, Burnett framed an eliminatory outlook toward native people as one of defense for the property of white settlers:The white man, to whom time is money, and who labors hard all day to create the comforts of life, cannot sit up all night to watch his property; and after being robbed a few times, he becomes desperate, and resolve upon a war of extermination. This is a common feeling among our people who have lived upon the Indian frontier ... That a war of extermination will continue to be waged between the races until the Indian race becomes extinct must be expected. While we cannot anticipate this result but with painful regret, the inevitable destiny of the race is beyond the power or wisdom of man to avert.The state formed various militia groups that were tasked with a "war of extermination" that authorized the murder of native people in exchange for payment for their scalps and heads. For example, the city of Shasta authorized "five dollars for every Indian head." In this period, 303 volunteer militia groups of 35,000 men were formed by the settlers. 

In the fiscal year of 1851-1852, California paid approximately $1 million dollars toward the formation of militia groups who would eliminate native people. Volunteer militia groups were also subsidized by the U.S. federal government, who reimbursed money to the state toward this eliminatory objective.

California Gold Rush and forced labor (1848–1855)

Most of inland California including California deserts and the Central Valley was in possession of native people until the acquisition of Alta California by the United States. The discovery of gold at Sutter's Mill in 1848 inspired a mass migration of Anglo-American settlers into areas where native people had avoided sustained encounters with invaders. The California Gold Rush involved a series of massacres and conflicts between settlers and the indigenous peoples of California lasting from about 1846 to 1873 that is generally referred to as the California genocide.

The negative impact of the California Gold Rush on both the local indigenous inhabitants and the environment were substantial, decimating the people still remaining. 100,000 native people died during the first two years of the gold rush alone. 

Settlers took land both for their camps and to farm and supply food for their camps. The surging mining population resulted in the disappearance of many food sources. Toxic waste from their operations killed fish and destroyed habitats. Settlers viewed indigenous people as obstacles for gold, so they actively went into villages where they raped the women and killed the men. 

Sexual violence against native women and young girls was a normal part of white settler life, who were often forced into prostitution or sex slavery. Kidnappings and rape of native women and girls was reported as occurring "daily and nightly." This violence against women often provoked attacks on white settlers by native men.

Forced labor was also common during the Gold Rush, permitted by the 1850 Act for the Government and Protection of Indians. Part of this law instituted the following as a legal practice:Any person could go before a Justice of Peace to obtain Indian children for indenture. The Justice determined whether or not compulsory means were used to obtain the child. If the Justice was satisfied that no coercion occurred, the person obtain a certificate that authorized him to have the care, custody, control and earnings of an Indian until their age of majority (for males, eighteen years, for females, fifteen years).Raids on native villages were common, where adults and children were threatened with fatal consequence for refusing what was essentially slavery. Although this was in legal terms illegal, the law was established not to help protect indigenous people, so there were rarely interventions to stop kidnappings and the circulation of stolen children into the market by law enforcement. What were effectively slave auctions occurred where laborers could be "purchased" for as low as 35 dollars. 

A central location for auctions was Los Angeles, where an 1850 city ordinance passed by the Los Angeles City Council allowed prisoners to be "auctioned off to the highest bidder for private service." Historian Robert Heizer referred to this as "a thinly disguised substitute for slavery." Auctions continued as a weekly practice for nearly twenty years until there were no California native people left to sell.

American unratified treaties (1851–1852) 

The United States Senate sent a group of consultants, Oliver Wozencraft, George Barbour, and Redick McKee to make treaties with the indigenous peoples of California in 1851. Leaders throughout the state signed 18 treaties with the government officials that guaranteed 7.5 million acres of land (or about 1/7th of California) in an attempt to ensure the future of their peoples amid encroaching settler colonialism. Anglo-American settlers in California responded with dissatisfaction and contempt at the treaties, believing the native people were being reserved too much land. Despite making agreements, the U.S. government sided with the settlers and tabled the treaties without informing the signees. They remained shelved and were never ratified.

California genocide (1846–1873) 

The California genocide continued after the California Gold Rush period. By the late 1850s, Anglo-American militias were invading the homelands of native people in the northern and mountainous areas of the state, which had avoided some earlier waves of violence due to their more remote locations. Near the end of the period associated with the California genocide, the final stage of the Modoc Campaign was triggered when Modoc men led by Kintpuash (AKA Captain Jack) murdered General Canby at the peace tent in 1873. However, it's not widely known that between 1851 and 1872 the Modoc population decreased by 75 to 88% as a result of seven anti-Modoc campaigns started by the whites. 

There is evidence that the first massacre of the Modocs by non-natives took place as early as 1840. According to the story told by a chief of the Achumawi tribe (neighboring to Modocs), a group of trappers from the north stopped by the Tule lake around the year 1840 and invited the Modocs to a feast. As they sat down to eat, the cannon was fired and many Indians were killed. The father of Captain Jack was among the survivors of that attack. Since then the Modocs resisted the intruders notoriously. Additionally, when in 1846 the Applegate Trail cut through the Modoc territory, the migrants and their livestock damaged and depleted the ecosystem that the Modoc depended on to survive.

20th century: Forced assimilation
By 1900, the population of native people who survived the eliminatory policies and acts carried out in the 19th century was estimated at about 16,000 people. Remaining native people continued to be the recipients of the U.S. policies of cultural genocide throughout the 20th century. Many other native people would experience false claims that they were "extinct" as a people throughout the century.

Indian removal in California (1903) 

Although the American policy of Indian removal to force indigenous peoples off of their homelands had begun much earlier in the United States in 1813, it was still being implemented as late as 1903 in Southern California. The last native removal in U.S. history occurred in what has been referred to as the Cupeño trail of tears, when the people were forced off of their homeland by white settlers, who sought ownership of what is now Warner Springs. The people were forced to move 75 miles from their home village of Cupa to Pala, California. The forced removal under threat of violence also included Luiseño and Kumeyaay villages in the area.

Indian boarding schools in California (1892–1935) 

During the end of the 19th century and the beginning of the 20th century, the government attempted to force indigenous peoples to further break the ties with their native culture and assimilate into white society. In California, the federal government established such forms of education as the reservation day schools and American Indian boarding schools. Three of the twenty-five off-reservation Indian boarding schools were in California, and ten schools total.

New students were customarily bathed in kerosene and their hair was cut upon arrival. Poor ventilation and nutrition and diseases were typical problems at schools. In addition to that, most parents disagreed with the idea of their children being raised as whites, with students being forced to wear European style clothes and haircuts, given European names, and strictly forbidden to speak indigenous languages. Sexual and physical abuse at the schools was common. 

By 1926, 83% of all Native American children attended the boarding schools. Native people recognized the American Indian boarding schools as institutionalized forces of elimination toward their native culture. They demanded the right for their children to access public schools. In 1935, restrictions that forbid native people from attending public schools were removed.

It was not until 1978 that native people won the legal right to prevent familial separation that was integral to native children being brought to the boarding schools. This separation often occurred without knowledge by parents, or under white claims that native children were "unsupervised" and were thus obligated to the school, and sometimes under threatening circumstances to families.

Unratified treaties reimbursement (1944–1946) 
Since the 1920s, various Indian activist groups were demanding that the federal government fulfill the conditions of the 18 treaties of 1851–1852 that were never ratified and were classified. In 1944 and in 1946, native peoples brought claims for reimbursements asking for compensations for the lands affected by treaties and Mexican land grants. They won $17.5 million and $46 million, respectively. Yet, the land agreed to in the treaties was not returned.

Religious Freedom Act in California (1978–) 

The American Indian Religious Freedom Act was passed by the U.S. government in 1978, which gave indigenous people some rights toward practicing their religion. In practice, this did not extend or include religious freedom in regard to indigenous people's religious relationship to environmental sites or their relationship with ecosystems. Religion tends to be understood as separate from the land in American Judeo-Christian terms, which differs from indigenous terms. While in theory religious freedom was protected, in practice, religious or ceremonial sites and practices were not protected.

In 1988, Lyng v. Northwest Indian Cemetery Protective Ass'n the U.S. Supreme Court sided with the U.S. Forest Service to build a road through a forest used for religious purposes by three nearby tribal nations in northwestern California. This was despite the recommendations of the expert witness on the matter, who stated that the construction of the road would destroy the religions of the three tribes. However, no protection was provided through the Religious Freedom Act.

The National Park Service mandates a no-gathering policy for cultural or religious purposes and the United States Forest Service (USFS) requires a special permit and fee, which prohibits native people's religious freedom. A 1995 mandate that would have provided conditional opportunities for gathering for this purpose failed to pass. Pesticide use in forests, such as the dropping of 11,000 pounds of granular hexazinone on 3,075 acres of the Stanislaus National Forest in 1996 by the USFS, deformed plants and sickened wildlife that are culturally and religiously significant to native people.

21st century

California has the largest population of Native Americans out of any state, with 723,000 identifying an "American Indian or Alaska Native" tribe as a component of their race (14% of the nation-wide total). This population grew by 15% between 2000 and 2010, much less than the nation-wide growth rate of 27%, but higher than the population growth rate for all races, which was about 10% in California over that decade. Over 50,000 indigenous people live in Los Angeles alone.

According to the National Conference of State Legislatures, there are currently over one hundred federally recognized native groups or tribes in California including those that spread to several states. Federal recognition officially grants the Indian tribes access to services and funding from the Bureau of Indian Affairs, and Federal and State funding for Tribal TANF/CalWORKs programs.

Recognition as genocide (2019) 

The California genocide was not acknowledged as a genocide by non-native people for over a century in California. In the 2010s, denial among politicians, academics, historians, and institutions such as public schools was commonplace. This has been credited to a lingering unwillingness of settler descendants who are "beneficiaries of genocidal policies (similar to throughout the United States generally)." This meant that the genocide was largely dismissed, distorted, and denied, sometimes through trivialization or even humor to create a self-positive image of settlers.

In 2019, 40th governor of California, Gavin Newsom signed an executive order formally apologizing to native people and for the formation of a Truth and Healing Council that would be "aimed at reporting on the historical relationships between the state and its Indigenous people." Of this history, Newsom stated: "Genocide. No other way to describe it, and that’s the way it needs to be described in the history books." This was a significant event in reducing the dismissal of the California genocide.

Language reawakening 

After a long decline of Indigenous language speakers as a result of violent punitive measures for speaking Indigenous languages at Indian boarding schools and other forms of cultural genocide, some Indigenous languages are being reawakened. Indigenous language revitalization in California has gained momentum among several tribes. There are some obstacles that remain, such as intergenerational trauma, funding, lack of access to records, and conversational regularity. Some languages with the most success are Chumash, Kumeyaay, Tolowa Dee-ni', Yurok, and Hoopa. 

Cheryl Tuttle, a Native American Studies Director and Wailaki teacher, commented that language revitalization can be both important for speakers themselves and for the homelands:For tens of thousands of years, the land had been prayed to and became accustomed to the Yuki and Wailaki languages. Not only do the people need the wisdom contained in the language, but the land misses hearing the people and needs to hear those healing songs and prayers again.

Prison-industrial complex 

Native people, and particularly native women, are disproportionately incarcerated in California. Some native people identify the modern prison-industrial complex as another reproduction of the "punishing institutions" that have been imposed onto them and built on their homelands since the arrival of European settlers, including military forts, ranchos, Spanish missions, Indian reservations, boarding schools, and prisons, each of which exploited native people as a source of labor for the economic interests of settlers. Prison labor in California has also been compared to California's history of forced labor of indigenous people.

Developments and desecrations 

In 1982, the California court case Wana the Bear v. Community Construction sided with developers in the destruction of a Miwok burial ground in Stockton, California. Over 600 burial remains were removed for a residential development and the Miwok had no power to stop development or to the remains of their ancestors, since Native American burial grounds were not legally considered cemeteries. The has been referred to as ethnocentrism in settler colonial law. In 1990, federally recognized tribes gained some rights to ancestral remains with the Native American Graves Protection and Repatriation Act.

This protection to ancestral remains does not prevent development on indigenous burial grounds, just a temporary consultation and return of remains or artifacts found. Tribes and tribal bands in urbanized or high-development areas, such as the Tongva (Los Angeles), Acjachemen (Orange County), and Ohlone (San Francisco Bay Area) struggle to protect burial grounds, village sites, and artifacts from disturbance and desecration, usually from residential and commercial developments, which has been a feature of daily life for native people in California since the arrival of European settlers.

The paved site of the West Berkeley Shellmound continues to be threatened by housing developments and has become a significant site of contention in the San Francisco Bay Area. Numerous Tongva village sites and burial grounds continue to be desecrated from developments in the greater Los Angeles area, such as the unearthing of 400 burials at Guashna for a development in Playa Vista in 2004. The Acjachemen sacred village site of Putiidhem was desecrated and buried underneath JSerra Catholic High School in 2003 despite protests from the people.

Land Back movement 

The Land Back movement in California has gained visibility and action in various places throughout the state. A significant moment was the return of Tuluwat Island to the Wiyot, which was the site of a massacre in 1860. It began in 2000 with a purchase by the tribe for 1.5 acres of the site, which was contaminated and abandoned as a shipyard. In 2015, the Eureka City Council voted to return the island. An article for CNN stated that this return is perhaps "the first time that a US municipality repatriated land to an indigenous tribe without strings attached." The official transfer occurred in 2019.

Tribes excluded from federal recognition do not have a land base, which makes tribal identity more invisible. Land back movements have formed to return land to these tribes. This includes the Sogorea Te’ Land Trust and the Tongva Taraxat Paxaavxa Conservancy, which established the Shuumi Land Tax and the kuuyam nahwá’a ("guest exchange") respectively as a way for people living on their traditional homelands to pay a form of contribution for living on the land. In 2021, the Alameda City Council voted to pay in Shuumi Tax $11,000 for two years, becoming the first city to pay the tax.

Material culture

Basket weaving 

Basket making was an important part of Native American Californian culture. Baskets were both beautiful and functional, made of twine, woven tight enough that they could hold water for cooking. Tribes made baskets in a wide variety of shapes and sizes to fulfill different daily functions, including "baby baskets, collecting vessels, food bowls, cooking items, ceremonial items" and wearable basket caps for both men and women. The watertight cooking baskets were often used for making acorn soup by placing fire-heated stones in the baskets with food mixtures, which were then stirred until cooked.

Baskets were generally made by women. Girls learned about the process from an early age, not just the act of weaving, but also how to tend, harvest, and prepare the plants for weaving.

Foods

The indigenous peoples of California had a rich and diverse resource base, with access to hundreds of types of edible plants, both terrestrial and marine mammals, birds and insects. The diversity of the food supply was particularly important and sets California apart from other areas, where if the primary food supply diminished for any reason it could be devastating for the people in that region. In California, the variety meant that if one supply failed there were hundreds of others to fall back on. Despite this abundance, there were still 20-30 primary food resources which native peoples were dependent on. Different tribes' diets included fish, shellfish, insects, deer, elk, antelope, and plants such as buckeye, sage seed, and yampah (Perideridia gairdneri).

Plant-based foods 

Acorns of the California Live Oak, Quercus agrifolia, were a primary traditional food throughout much of California. The acorns were ground into meal, and then either boiled into mush or baked in ashes to make bread. Acorns contain large amounts of tannic acid, so turning them into a food source required a discovery of how to remove this acid and significant amounts of labor to process them. Grinding in the mortal and pestle, then boiling allows for the tannins to be leached out in the water. There was also the need to harvest and store acorns like crops since they were only available in the fall. Acorns were stored in large granaries within villages, "providing a reliable food source through the winter and spring."

Native American tribes also used the berries of the Manzanita as a staple food source. The ripe berries were eaten raw, cooked or made into jellies. The pulp of the berries could also be dried and crushed to make a cider, while the dry seeds were sometimes ground to make flour. The bark was also used to make a tea, which would help the bladder and kidneys.

Native Americans also made extensive use of the California juniper for medicinal purposes and as a food. 
 The Ohlone and the Kumeyaay brewed a tea made from juniper leaves to use as a painkiller and to help remedy a hangover. They also picked the berries for eating, either fresh or dried and pulverised. The ripe berries of the California huckleberry were also collected and eaten by many peoples in the region.

Marine life

There were two types of marine mammals important as food sources, large migratory species such as northern elephant seals and California sea lions and non-migratory, such as harbor seals and sea otters. Marine mammals were hunted for their meat and blubber, but even more importantly for their furs. Otter pelts in particular were important both for trade and as symbols of status.

A large quantity and variety of marine fish lived along the west coast of California, providing shoreline communities with food. Tribes living along the coast did mostly shore-based fishing.

Anadromous fish 

Anadromous fish live half their life the in the sea and the other half in the river where they come to spawn. Large rivers such as the Klamath and Sacramento "provided abundant fish along hundreds of miles during the spawning season." Pacific salmon in particular were very important in the Californian Native American diet. Pacific salmon ran in Californian coastal rivers and streams from the Oregon line down to Baja California. For northwestern groups like Yurok and Karuk, Salmon was the defining food. For example, more than half of the diet of the Karuk people consisted of acorns and salmon from the Klamath River. This combination of fish with acorns distinguished them from some societies in the north which focused solely on fishing.

In contrast to acorns, fish required sophisticated equipment such as dip nets and harpoons and they could only be caught during a brief seasonal window. During this time, salmon would be harvested, dried and stored in large quantities for later consumption.

Society and culture 
Tribes lived in societies where men and women had different roles. Women were generally responsible for weaving, harvesting, processing, and preparing food, while men were generally responsible for hunting and other forms of labor. It was also noted by Juan Crespi and Pedro Fages of "men who dressed as women" being an integral part of native society. The Spanish generally detested these people, who they referred to as joyas in mission records. With colonialism "joyas were driven from their communities by tribal members at the instigation of priests and made homeless." The joyas traditionally were responsible for death, burial, and mourning rituals and performed women's roles.

Many tribes in Central California and Northern California practised the Kuksu religion, especially the Nisenan, Maidu, Pomo and Patwin tribes. The practice of Kuksu included elaborate narrative ceremonial dances and specific regalia. A male secret society met in underground dance rooms and danced in disguises at the public dances.

In Southern California the Toloache religion was dominant among tribes such as the Luiseño and Diegueño. Ceremonies were performed after consuming a hallucinogenic drink made of the jimsonweed or Toloache plant (Datura meteloides), which put devotees in a trance and gave them access to supernatural knowledge.

Native American culture in California was also noted for its rock art, especially among the Chumash of southern California. The rock art, or pictographs were brightly colored paintings of humans, animals and abstract designs, and were thought to have had religious significance.

Reservations 

Reservations with over 500 people:

List of peoples

Achomawi, Achumawi, Pit River tribe, northeastern California
Atsugewi, northeastern California
Chemehuevi, eastern California
Chumash, coastal southern California
"Barbareño", Coast Central Chumash
"Cruzeño, Isleño", Island Chumash
"Emigdiano", Tecuya, Interior Central Chumash
"Interior", Cuyama, Interior Northwestern Chumash
"Inezeño", "Ineseño", Samala, Inland Central Chumash 
"Obispeño", Yak-tityu-tityu-yak-tilhini, Northern Chumash
"Purisimeño", Kagismuwas, Northern Chumash
"Ventureño", Alliklik – Castac, Southern Chumash
Chilula, northwestern California
Chimariko, extinct, northwestern California
Kuneste, "Eel River Athapaskan peoples"
Lassik, northwestern California
Mattole (Bear River), northwestern California
Nongatl, northwestern California
Sinkyone, northwestern California
Wailaki, Wai-lakki, northwestern California
Esselen, west-central California
Hupa, northwestern California
Tsnungwe
Karok, northwestern California
Kato, Cahto, northwestern California
Kawaiisu, southeast-central California
Konkow, northern-central California
Kumeyaay, Diegueño, Kumiai
Ipai, southwestern California
Jamul, southwestern California
Tipai, southwestern California and northwestern Mexico
La Jolla complex, southern California, c. 6050–1000 BCE
Maidu, northeastern California
Konkow, northern California
Yamani, Mechoopda, northern California
Nisenan, Southern Maidu, northern California
Miwok, Me-wuk, central California
Bay Miwok, west-central California
Coast Miwok, west-central California
Lake Miwok, west-central California
Valley and Sierra Miwok
Monache, Western Mono, central California
Mohave, southeastern California
Nisenan, eastern-central California
Nomlaki, northwestern California
Ohlone, Costanoan, west-central California
Awaswas
Chalon
Chochenyo
Karkin
Mutsun
Ramaytush
Rumsen
Tamyen
Yelamu
Patwin, central California
Suisun, Southern Patwin, central California
Pauma Complex, southern California, c. 6050–1000 BCE
Pomo, northwestern and central-western California
Quechan, Yuman, southeastern California
Te'po'ta'ahl, ("Salinan"), coastal central California
"Antoniaño"
"Migueleño"
"Playano"
Shasta northwestern California
Konomihu, northwestern California
Okwanuchu, northwestern California
Tolowa, northwestern California
Takic
Acjachemem, ("Juaneño"), Takic, southwestern California
Iívil̃uqaletem, Iviatim, ("Cahuilla"), Takic southern California
Kitanemuk, ("Tejon") Takic, south-central California
Kuupangaxwichem, ("Cupeño"), southern California
Payómkawichum, ("Luiseño"), Takic, southwestern California
Tataviam, Allilik Takic ("Fernandeño"), southern California
Tongva, ("Gabrieleño"), ("Fernandeño"), ("Nicoleño"), "San Clemente tribe" Takic, coastal southern California
Yuhaviatam Morongo, Vanyume Mohineyam ("Serrano"), southern California
Tubatulabal, south-central California
Bankalachi, Toloim, south-central California
Pahkanapil, south-central California
Palagewan, south-central California
Wappo, north-central California
Whilkut, northwestern California
Wintu, northwestern California
Wiyot, northwestern California
Yana, northern-central California
Yahi
Yokuts, central and southern California
Chukchansi, Foothill Yokuts, central California
Northern Valley Yokuts, central California
Tachi tribe, Southern Valley Yokuts, south-central California
Timbisha, eastern California
Yuki, Ukomno'm, northwestern California
Huchnom, northwestern California
Yurok, northwestern California

Languages

Before European contact, native Californians spoke over 300 dialects of approximately 100 distinct languages. The large number of languages has been related to the ecological diversity of California, and to a sociopolitical organization into small tribelets (usually 100 individuals or fewer) with a shared "ideology that defined language boundaries as unalterable natural features inherent in the land". Together, the area had more linguistic diversity than all of Europe combined.

"The majority of California Indian languages belong either to highly localized language families with two or three members (e.g. Yukian, Maiduan) or are language isolates (e.g. Karuk, Esselen)." Of the remainder, most are Uto-Aztecan or Athapaskan languages. Larger groupings have been proposed. The Hokan superstock has the greatest time depth and has been most difficult to demonstrate; Penutian is somewhat less controversial.

There is evidence suggestive that speakers of the Chumashan languages and Yukian languages, and possibly languages of southern Baja California such as Waikuri, were in California prior to the arrival of Penutian languages from the north and Uto-Aztecan from the east, perhaps predating even the Hokan languages. Wiyot and Yurok are distantly related to Algonquian languages in a larger grouping called Algic. The several Athapaskan languages are relatively recent arrivals, having arrived about 2000 years ago.

See also

Aboriginal title in California
California State Indian Museum
Indigenous peoples of Mexico
List of federally recognized tribes by state#California
Martis people
Mission Indians
Population of Native California
Survey of California and Other Indian Languages
Traditional narratives of Indigenous Californians

References

Further reading
 Hinton, Leanne (1994). Flutes of Fire: Essays on California Indian Languages. Berkeley: Heyday Books. .

 Lightfoot, Kent G. and Otis Parrish (2009). California Indians and Their Environment: An Introduction.  Berkeley: University of California Press. .

External links

"Information About California Tribes" Northern California Indian Development Council
Advocates for Indigenous California Language Survival
California Indian Museum and Cultural Center, Santa Rosa
"California Indian History," California Native American Heritage Association
"California Indians," SDSU Library and Information Access
Bibliographies of Northern and Central California Indians
"A Glossary of Proper Names in California Prehistory" , Society for California Archaeology
27th Annual California Indian Conference, California State University San Marcos, Oct. 5–6, 2012

 
 
 
 Indigenous peoples
California